Richie Hearn (born January 4, 1971) is an American former racing driver.

Hearn was born in Glendale, California.  He ran in the Toyota Atlantic championship for two seasons, winning the title in 1995.  In 1996, he began driving for John Della Penna in both the IRL and Champ Car ranks.  He won an IRL race at the Las Vegas Motor Speedway to cap off the year and was the highest finishing rookie at the Indianapolis 500, finishing 3rd.

Hearn moved full-time into Champ Car in 1997 for Della Penna with high-profile sponsor Budweiser but failed to post significant results and by 2000 was surplus for sponsored driver Norberto Fontana.  He contested a few more Indy 500s, with a best result of 6th in 2002.  In 2005 following the Indy 500 he retired as a driver and started Hearn Motorsports LLC that ran in the Star Mazda series.  He planned to move the team into Toyota Atlantic competition in 2006. Hearn returned from retirement to qualify on Bump Day of the 2007 Indianapolis 500 in a car jointly entered by Racing Professionals and Hemelgarn Racing.

Hearn is currently a driving instructor at Spring Mountain Motorsports Ranch's Ron Fellows driving school.

Motorsports Career Results

American Open-Wheel racing results
(key)

CART

IndyCar Series

Indianapolis 500

External links
Driver Database Profile

1971 births
Atlantic Championship drivers
Champ Car drivers
Indianapolis 500 drivers
IndyCar Series drivers
Living people
Sportspeople from Glendale, California
Racing drivers from California
International Kart Federation drivers
Arrow McLaren SP drivers
A. J. Foyt Enterprises drivers